The team normal hill/4x5 km was held on 24 February 2013.

Ski jumping
The ski jumping was started at 10:00.

Cross-country skiing
The cross-country skiing was started at 15:00.

References

FIS Nordic World Ski Championships 2013